Swall Meadows is an unincorporated community and census-designated place (CDP) in southern Mono County, California, United States. The population was 178 as of the 2020 census. The community is residential, including second homes and a volunteer fire department, but no commercial development. The ZIP Code is 93514. The community is inside area code 760.

Geography
It is in pinon-juniper/subalpine zone habitat, with views south along the Sierra Crest of Mt. Tom, and east across the Owens Valley to the White Mountains and Nevada. It is accessed from "old 395", or Lower Rock Creek Road. It also well known in the area as an important deer migration route for the Round Valley mule deer population, which cherish the grazing in the meadow and apple falls from the old orchard trees.

At the high, northwestern end is the old Sky Meadows Ranch, then houses and firehouse near the meadow, and at the southeast end a development known as Pinyon Ranch.

In addition to the predominant pinyon-juniper-sagebrush habitat, there are permanent and seasonal streams and the eponymous meadow with wetter-habitat vegetation such as Jeffrey pines, willows, stream and bog orchids, and the remnant trees of the old commercial apple orchard. In 2011 the Eastern Sierra Land Trust secured a conservation easement to protect  of the Swall Meadows meadow area (location of the historic homesite), for the continued benefit of the migrating mule deer. A number of other conservation easements have been completed in Swall Meadows since the ESLT organization was founded in 2001.

Between Paradise and Swall Meadows the old wagon road can be seen that climbed about  up the Sherwin Grade from Owens Valley toward Crowley Lake.

Demographics
The 2010 United States Census reported that Swall Meadows had a population of 220. The racial makeup of Swall Meadows was 201 (91.4%) White, 0 (0.0%) African American, 3 (1.4%) Native American, 5 (2.3%) Asian, 0 (0.0%) Pacific Islander, 2 (0.9%) from other races, and 9 (4.1%) from two or more races. Hispanic or Latino of any race were 6 persons (2.7%).

The Census reported that 220 people (100% of the population) lived in households, 0 (0%) lived in non-institutionalized group quarters, and 0 (0%) were institutionalized.  

There were 98 households, out of which 25 (25.5%) had children under the age of 18 living in them, 68 (69.4%) were opposite-sex married couples living together, 4 (4.1%) had a female householder with no husband present, 3 (3.1%) had a male householder with no wife present.  There were 2 (2.0%) unmarried opposite-sex partnerships, and 0 (0%) same-sex married couples or partnerships. 21 households (21.4%) were made up of individuals, and 10 (10.2%) had someone living alone who was 65 years of age or older. The average household size was 2.24.  There were 75 families (76.5% of all households); the average family size was 2.60.

The population was spread out, with 36 people (16.4%) under the age of 18, 6 people (2.7%) aged 18 to 24, 37 people (16.8%) aged 25 to 44, 99 people (45.0%) aged 45 to 64, and 42 people (19.1%) who were 65 years of age or older.  The median age was 53.8 years. For every 100 females, there were 89.7 males.  For every 100 females age 18 and over, there were 100.0 males.

The homeowner vacancy rate was 0%; the rental vacancy rate was 0%.  201 people (91.4% of the population) lived in owner-occupied housing units and 19 people (8.6%) lived in rental housing units.

Government

Round Fire
On February 6, 2015, Swall Meadows and the neighboring community of Paradise were ravaged by the Round Fire, which burned . The fire destroyed 40 homes: 39 homes in Swall Meadows and 1 home in Paradise.

See also
2015 California wildfires

References

External links

Photos and video of Round Fire at Swall Meadows

Census-designated places in Mono County, California
Populated places in the Sierra Nevada (United States)